Charles Koffi Diby (7 September 1957 – 7 December 2019) was a politician from Ivory Coast. He was the Minister of Economy and Finance from April 2007 to November 2012. Then he served as the Minister of Foreign Affairs of the Ivory Coast from 2012 to 2016. He died on 7 December 2019, aged 62.

References

Sources
article on Diby's visit to Brazil

1957 births
2019 deaths
Finance ministers of Ivory Coast
Ivorian politicians
Foreign Ministers of Ivory Coast